Sir John Walter Pollen, 2nd Baronet of Redenham (6 April 1784 – 2 May 1863) was a British Conservative and Tory politician.

He was the eldest son of Sir John Pollen, 1st Baronet of Redenham Park, Hampshire and educated at Eton (1799) and Christ Church, Oxford (1803) after which he entered Lincoln's Inn to study law (1806). He succeeded in 1814 to the baronetcy and the Redenham estate, upon the death of his father.

Pollen was elected MP for Andover at the 1820 general election and held the seat until 1831 when he did not seek re-election. He returned to the seat in 1835 and held it again until 1841, when he stood but was defeated.

He married in 1819, Charlotte Elizabeth, the daughter of Rev. John Craven of Chilton Foliat, Wiltshire, but left no children. Upon his death in 1863 he was succeeded in the baronetcy by his nephew Sir Richard Hungerford Pollen, 3rd Baronet. Redenham passed to his widow and on her death in 1877 to the son of the 3rd Baronet, also Richard Hungerford Pollen, later the 4th Baronet.

References

External links
 

1784 births
1863 deaths
People educated at Eton College
Alumni of Christ Church, Oxford
Members of Lincoln's Inn
Conservative Party (UK) MPs for English constituencies
UK MPs 1820–1826
UK MPs 1826–1830
UK MPs 1830–1831
UK MPs 1835–1837
UK MPs 1837–1841
Baronets in the Baronetage of Great Britain
People from Appleshaw